Attilio Regolo is an Italian-language opera seria by Johann Adolph Hasse based on the story of Marcus Atilius Regulus, a Roman general taken prisoner in Carthage, who elects death rather than ransom. Pietro Metastasio wrote the libretto in 1740 for the birthday of the emperor Charles VI but the illness, then death, of the emperor prevented the libretto being set to music at the time. Hasse's opera premiered on 12 January 1750 at the Opernhaus am Zwinger in Dresden. The role of Regolo was taken by the castrato Domenico Annibali, while the role of Attilia was composed for Hasse's wife Faustina Bordoni.

Recordings
Attilio Regolo Axel Köhler (Regolo), Markus Schäfer (Manlio), Martina Borst (Attilia), Sibylla Rubens (Publio), Carmen Fuggiss (Barce), Michael Volle (Licinio), Randall Wong (Amilcare), Cappella Sagittariana Dresden, Frieder Bernius. concert performance 1997, Profil 2018

References

External links

Work details, Corago, University of Bologna
Libretto (1750)
Libretto (1775)

Operas
1750 operas
Operas by Johann Adolf Hasse
Opera seria
Italian-language operas
Libretti by Metastasio